Skeletonema dohrnii is a diatom. Together with S. marinoi, this species has flattened extremities of the processes of the fultoportulae, which interlock with those of succeeding valves without forming knuckles. It is a species of the genus Skeletonema that can be found in many waters across the globe. In the coastal waters of South Korea, their cell diameters are about 3 to 6 micrometers.

References

Further reading
Kooistra, Wiebe HCF, et al. "Global diversity and biogeography of Skeletonema species (Bacillariophyta)." Protist 159.2 (2008): 177-193.
Ellegaard, Marianne, et al. "The species concept in a marine diatom: LSU rDNA-based phylogenetic differentiation in Skeletonema marinoi/dohrnii (Bacillariophyceae) is not reflected in morphology." Phycologia 47.2 (2008): 156-167.
Jung, Seung Won, et al. "Morphological characteristics of four species in the genus Skeletonema in coastal waters of South Korea." Algae 24.4 (2009): 195-203.

External links

AlgaeBase

Protists described in 2005
Thalassiosirales